I'll Share My World with You is an album by American country music artist George Jones. This album was released in 1969 (see  1969 in country music) on the Musicor Records label. Tammy Wynette, who married Jones that year, is pictured on the cover.

Background
By 1969, Jones was becoming increasingly unhappy with the production of his albums on Musicor, for which he primarily blamed his longtime producer and mentor Pappy Daily.  According to the Bob Allen biography George Jones: The Life and Times of a Honky Tonk Legend, Jones was disappointed with the haphazard uneven production quality of the records he'd made under the supervision of both Pappy and Art Talmadge and suspicious about the flurry of document signing that accompanied his various record label changes instigated by Daily over the years.  Adding to the growing estrangement between Jones and Daily was the arrival of Tammy Wynette in the singer's life.  Jones became aware of the pretty blond country singer after she scored a minor hit with "Apartment No. 9" in 1966, and their paths kept crossing because their tours were booked by the same agency.  They began touring as part of the same show and soon Jones took more than a passing fancy to Wynette, who was eleven years his junior and grew up listening to all of his records.  They soon became romantically involved and were married in 1969.  Wynette encouraged Jones to update his image, altering his hairstyle and stage clothes, and soon Jones was longing to leave Musicor so he could record with Wynette and her red hot producer Billy Sherrill on Epic Records.  As Jones biographer Bob Allen observes, Jones "was more than anxious to be free of his association with Musicor – which he felt had resulted in some of the shoddiest records he'd made in the course of his long career – even if it did mean spreading a lot of money around."  Jones would eventually buy out his contract with Musicor and jump to Epic.

Although Wynette appears on the album jacket of I'll Share My World With You and sings backup on the title track, she was not credited by name.

Composition

The song "I'll Share My World With You" was written a Miami songwriter named Ben Wilson and would reach number two on the country singles chart in 1969.  The buzz over the blooming romance between Jones and Wynette – and her insinuating presence on the LP's album cover – only increased interest in the ballad, which was similar in theme and style to Jones's 1967 number one "Walk Through This World With Me."  Ironically, "I'll Share My World With You" was kept out of the number one spot by Wynette's own monster hit "Stand By Your Man".  "When The Grass Grows Over Me" also reached number two and was written by Don Chapel, who was married to Wynette when she and Jones first got to know one another.  As he recalled in his memoir I Lived To Tell It All in 1996, Jones went to their house one night for supper and an angry Chapel called his wife "a son of a bitch".  Jones wrote: "I felt rage fly all over me. I jumped from my chair, put my hands under the dinner table, and flipped it over. Dishes, utensils, and glasses flew in all directions. Don's and Tammy's eyes got about as big as the flying dinner plates." Jones professed his love for Wynette on the spot.

"Milwaukee (Here I Come)", a duet with fellow Texan Brenda Carter, would climb to number twelve on the country charts.  I'll Share My World With You also features a rerecording of "The Race Is On" (with Tammy on background vocals), which had been a top five smash for Jones in 1964 on United Artists.

I'll Share My World With You would reach number 5 on the country albums chart.

Track listing 
 "I'll Share My World With You" (Ben Wilson)
 "I Don't Have Sense Enough" (Billy J. Smith)
 "Do What You Think's Best" (Jimmy Peppers)
 "Heartaches and Hangovers" (Joseph Robertson, Dave Sullivan)
 "Milwaukee, Here I Come" (Lee Fykes) (with Brenda Carter) – 2:36
 "When the Grass Grows Over Me" (Don Chapel)
 "You've Become My Everything" (Charlie Carter)
 "When the Wife Runs Off" (Earl Montgomery)
 "Our Happy Home" (Roy Acuff)
 "The Race Is On" (Don Rollins)

References

External links
 George Jones' Official Website

1969 albums
George Jones albums
Musicor Records albums
Albums produced by Pappy Daily